Ray Rene Romero (born December 31, 1927) is a former American football guard who played for the Philadelphia Eagles. He played college football at Kansas State University, having previously attended Wichita North High School in Wichita. He was of Mexican American descent.

References

Living people
1927 births
American football offensive linemen
Kansas State Wildcats football players
Philadelphia Eagles players
Players of American football from Wichita, Kansas
American sportspeople of Mexican descent